Anthranilic acid hydroxylase may refer to:

 Anthranilate 3-monooxygenase
 Anthranilate 1,2-dioxygenase (deaminating, decarboxylating)